Rasmus Fyrpihl (born 12 April 1995) is a Swedish former professional ice hockey player. He played with hometown club Örebro HK in the Swedish Hockey League (SHL).

Fyrpihl made his Swedish Hockey League debut playing with Örebro HK during the 2014–15 SHL season.

References

External links

1995 births
Living people
Swedish ice hockey left wingers
HC Vita Hästen players
Örebro HK players
Sportspeople from Örebro